The 2021 European Rally Championship was the 69th season of the FIA European Rally Championship, the European continental championship series in rallying. The season was also the ninth following the merge between the European Rally Championship and the Intercontinental Rally Challenge. Alexey Lukyanuk was the reigning champion.
Andreas Mikkelsen won the championship after 2021 Rally Hungary, using a Toksport WRT prepared Škoda Fabia R5 Evo. Mikkelsen therefore became the only driver to win the ERC and WRC-2 championship in one year and the first Norwegian to win ERC.

Classes 

 FIA ERC: Main open class for all current FIA-homologated cars within sporting classes RC2 to RC5, with Rally2 cars the leading contenders.
 FIA ERC2: Second tier, for cars more standard, albeit with turbocharged engines and four-wheel drive. This class allows the N4, the Rally2-Kit and RGT rules.
 FIA ERC3: Third ERC tier, the first for front-wheel-drive cars. Allows Rally4, Rally5, R3 (Group R) and Group A cars.
 FIA ERC Junior: For drivers aged 28 and under on 1 January 2021 in Rally3 cars. The champion receives a prize to contest the Junior World Rally Championship in 2022.
 FIA ERC3 Junior: For drivers aged 28 and under on 1 January 2021 in Rally4 and Rally5 cars on Pirelli control tyres. The winner earns a drive in ERC Junior in 2022.
 FIA European Rally Championship for Teams: each team can nominate a maximum of three cars (from all categories), counting the two highest-placed cars from each team.
 Abarth Rally Cup: competition with six rounds of the ERC with the rear-wheel-drive Abarth 124 rally.
 Clio Trophy by Toksport WRT: competition with five rounds of the ERC for Renault Clio RSR Rally5.

Calendar 
The 2021 season is contested over eight rounds across Central, Northern and Southern Europe:

Entries

ERC

ERC-2

ERC-3

Results and standings

Season summary

Scoring system

Points for final position are awarded as in the following table in ERC, ERC-2, ERC-3, ERC Junior and ERC-3 Junior. In ERC, ERC-2 and ERC-3, the best seven scores from the eight rounds count towards the final number of points. In the junior categories, the best five from six rounds are retained.

Additionally, bonus points are awarded for the first five positions in each Leg.

In the Abarth Rally Cup and the Clio Trophy, points are awarded as in the following table. Bonus points are not awarded in these categories. The final round for Clio Trophy (Rally Hungary) is awarded with double points.

Drivers' Championships

ERC

ERC-2

Notes
† – Tibor Erdi finished 2nd in Rally Liepaja, but was unable to score points in both ERC and ERC-2 due to an illegal recce by a team member.

ERC-3

ERC Junior

ERC-3 Junior

Abarth Rally Cup

Clio Trophy by Toksport WRT

Teams' Championship

Notes

References

External links
 

European Rally
Rally
2021